Namık Tan (born 1956 in Mardin, Turkey) was the ambassador of Turkey to the United States. He held that office from February 2010 until May 2014. He was a former ambassador of Turkey to Israel between 2007 and 2009. He also served in the United Arab Emirates, Russia, and in senior positions at the Ministry of Foreign Affairs.

Early life
Tan's family traces its ancestral roots to Bulgaria, Greece, Ossetia, Syria, and elsewhere. He became interested in diplomacy at a young age. His father was a Turkish administrator and his work required the family to move around frequently. This broad exposure prompted Tan to take the foreign service examination. He studied law but did not become a lawyer.

See also
 List of Turkish diplomats

References

1956 births
Living people
21st-century diplomats
People from Mardin
Ambassadors of Turkey to Israel
Ambassadors of Turkey to the United States